Zisis Karachalios (born 10 January 1996) is a Greek professional footballer who plays as a midfielder for Super League club PAS Giannina.

Career 
Karachalios signed with Greek Superleague side PAS Giannina on a free transfer.

Career statistics

References

External links 
 

1996 births
Living people
Greek footballers
Greece under-21 international footballers
Greece youth international footballers
Super League Greece players
Super League Greece 2 players
Anagennisi Karditsa F.C. players
Levadiakos F.C. players
Olympiacos F.C. players
PAS Giannina F.C. players
Association football midfielders
Footballers from Karditsa
21st-century Greek people